The Zlaști is a left tributary of the river Cerna in Romania. It discharges into the Cerna in the city Hunedoara.

References

External links

Rivers of Romania
Rivers of Hunedoara County